Elyes Karamosli (born 22 August 1989 in Hammam-Lif, Tunisia) is a Tunisian volleyball player. He is 198 cm tall and plays as outside hitter.  His brother Hosni also represented Tunisia in Olympic volleyball.

Clubs

Awards

Club
  1 African Championship (2014)
  1 Arab Clubs Championship (2014)
  1 Tunisian League (2015)
  2 Tunisian Cup (2010, 2014)
  1 Tunisian Super Cup (2009)

National team
  1 Arab Championship (2012)
  1 African Championship U21 (2008)

References

Page at FIVB.org

People from Ben Arous Governorate
1989 births
Living people
Volleyball players at the 2012 Summer Olympics
Tunisian men's volleyball players
Olympic volleyball players of Tunisia
Mediterranean Games silver medalists for Tunisia
Competitors at the 2013 Mediterranean Games
Mediterranean Games medalists in volleyball
Volleyball players at the 2020 Summer Olympics
20th-century Tunisian people
21st-century Tunisian people